The Australia national futsal team, nicknamed the Futsalroos, represents Australia in men's international futsal. The team is controlled by the governing body for soccer in Australia, Football Australia, which is currently a member of both the Asian Football Confederation (AFC) and the regional ASEAN Football Federation (AFF) since leaving the Oceania Football Confederation (OFC) in 2006. The team's official nickname is the Futsalroos.

Australia is a five-time OFC champion. The team has represented Australia at the FIFA Futsal World Cup tournaments on 7 occasions, but have never advanced beyond the group stage of the competition. After the 2016 FIFA Futsal World Cup, Football Australia decided not to continue investing and developing futsal in Australia. The F-League was disbanded in 2017, and Australia national futsal team is quickly becoming weaker than before.

History

Coaching staff

Players
For all past and present players who have appeared for the national team, see Australia national futsal team players.

Current squad
The following 14 players were named in the squad for the 2022 AFF Futsal Championship from 2–10 April 2022.

|}

Results and fixtures

2019

2022

Competitive record

FIFA Futsal World Cup

OFC Futsal Championship

^Australia was no longer part of the OFC. They appeared as a guest nation.

AFC Futsal Asian Cup

AFF Futsal Championship

Honours

AFF Futsal Championship
Runners-up (4): 2007, 2013, 2014, 2015

OFC Futsal Championship
Champions (5): 1992, 1996, 1999, 2004, 2013

Other Federations
In addition to the FFA administered Futsal, an organisation known as the Federation of Australian Futsal (FAF) considers itself the governing body of Futsal in Australia under the membership of the international body, Asociación Mundial de Futsal (AMF). The AMF organises the AMF Futsal World Cup.

AMF Futsal World Cup

See also
 Futsal in Australia
 Football Australia
 Australia national soccer team

References

External links
 Official Futsalroos Website
  OzFootball's Futsalroos section.
 FFAA's National Team & UEFS Associated Member. International Tours Information
 Futsal4all Australia
 Interview with Steven Knight
 Photographs

Asian national futsal teams
Futsal
Futsal in Australia